Karl-Heinz Friedrich (born 31 July 1934) is a retired German gymnast. He competed at the 1960 Summer Olympics in all artistic gymnastics events and finished in seventh place with the German team. Individually his best achievement was 31st place on the horizontal bar. In 1958 he won two national titles, on the floor and horizontal bar.

References

1934 births
Living people
German male artistic gymnasts
Gymnasts at the 1960 Summer Olympics
Olympic gymnasts of the United Team of Germany
People from Zwickau
Sportspeople from Saxony